Major General Angus Iain Ramsay,  (born 1946) is a former British Army officer who served as Commander British Forces Cyprus from 1998 to 2000.

Military career
Ramsay was commissioned into the Royal Highland Fusiliers in 1964. He commanded a rifle company of the Sultan of Oman's Armed Forces during the Dhofar Rebellion and became commanding officer of the Ulster Defence Regiment in 1990 during the Troubles. He went on to become Chief of Staff at the Sovereign Base Areas in Cyprus in 1992, chief of Staff of the United Nations Force in Bosnia in 1993 and Commander of the Multi-National Division (South-West) in Bosnia in 1997 before becoming Commander of British Forces Cyprus and Administrator of the Sovereign Base Areas in 1998. He retired in 2000.

References

|-

British Army generals
Commanders of the Order of the British Empire
Royal Highland Fusiliers officers
Ulster Defence Regiment officers
Companions of the Distinguished Service Order
1946 births
Living people
British military personnel of the Dhofar Rebellion
Military of Oman